Stokes is an impact crater on Mars, located on the Martian Northern plains at 55.9°N latitude and 188.8°W longitude. The crater's name was officially adopted by IAU's Working Group for Planetary System Nomenclature in 1973.

It is distinctive for its dark-toned sand dunes, which have been formed by the planet's strong winds. Research released in July 2010 showed that is one of at least nine craters in the northern lowlands that contains hydrated minerals. They are clay minerals, also called phyllosilicates.

References 

Impact craters on Mars
Cebrenia quadrangle